The 1st Asian Indoor Games were held in Bangkok, Thailand from November 12 to 19, 2005.

Venues

Bangkok
 Indoor Stadium Huamark - Dancesport
 Thai-Japanese Stadium - Futsal
 Nimibutr Stadium - Indoor cycling
 The Mall Bangkapi - Sepak takraw
 Huamark Sports Complex - Short course swimming

Phuket
 Saphan Hin Sports Complex - Aerobic gymnastics, Muaythai

Suphanburi
 Suphanburi X-Games Sports Stadium - Extreme sports
 Suphanburi Sports Complex - Sport climbing

Pattaya
 Indoor Athletics Stadium - Indoor athletics

Emblem
The “Logo” of the 1st Asian Indoor Games itself comprises 9 sparkling stars that represent the opinions of the Asian people at large:

 Spirit and soul of mankind 
 Sporting spirit 
 Creation of friendship 
 Building good physical appearances 
 Inspiration 
 Creative thinking 
 Solidarity 
 Peacefulness 
 Human freedom

The sun is the symbol of the Olympic Council of Asia. The redline, the blue line and the golden line forming like an “A” shape, together with a Thai roof, represent the Asian continent and the Asian Games. The golden line that resembling Thai smile, expressing a warm welcome to visitors.

Mascot 

Each sport discipline is animated with an elephant, thus giving the appearance of its cartoon movements in all events to be competed in the 1st Asian Indoor Games 2005. Children and other people alike will be fond of them, pleasant to look at them and keeping them for a souvenir after the end of the Games.

The blue and athletic elephant was named Hey and the yellow and plump one was Há.  They were to convey the meaning of amusement, merriment and relaxation, thus in a way reflecting the natures of the Asian Indoor Games a great deal.

Participating nations 
There are 37 Asian countries confirmed to participate in the game.

Sports

Calendar

Medal table

External links
 OCA: First Asian Indoor Games

 
Asian Games, Indoor
Asian Games, Indoor
Asian Games, Indoor
Asian Games, Indoor
Asian Indoor Games
Asian Games, Indoor